Sir Thomas à Beckett (31 August 1836 – 21 June 1919) was an Australian solicitor and judge.

Personal
Thomas à Beckett was born in London, England.  He was the eldest son of Thomas Turner à Beckett and arrived in  Australia with his father (brother of Sir William à Beckett) in January 1851, arriving in Melbourne on the Andromache.

À Beckett attended a private school in Melbourne but went back to England in 1856 and on 18 May 1857 became a student at Lincoln's Inn, being called to the bar on 17 November 1857. He returned to Victoria, and was admitted to the bar there on 16 August 1860, and practised before the Supreme Court of Victoria in Melbourne. In 1866 he was made a puisne judge of the Victorian Supreme Court and was frequently required to act as Victoria's Chief Justice.

In 1875 à Beckett married Isabella, the daughter of Sir Archibald Michie, who survived him with two sons and three daughters. A younger brother, Edward à Beckett (1844-1932), was a portrait painter. Examples of his work are at the Supreme Court, Melbourne.

He was knighted as Knight Bachelor during 1909.

In 1916 the Victorian bar presented his portrait by Max Meldrum to the Supreme Court library, and the opportunity was taken to express the affection in which à Beckett was held.

Sir Thomas à Beckett died at Melbourne on 21 June 1919.

Professional
À Beckett was called to the bar in 1859 while he was still in England.  He returned to Melbourne in 1860 where he established his practice as a solicitor, specializing in equity. He was lecturer in the law of procedure for several years at the University of Melbourne from 1874 onwards, and had been leader of the equity bar for some time when he was appointed a supreme court judge in September 1886.

À Beckett served as a judge from 30 September 1886 until 30 June 1917 on the Supreme Court of Victoria.  He retired on 31 July 1917.

See also
 Judiciary of Australia
 List of Judges of the Supreme Court of Victoria
 Victorian Bar Association

References

External links
 Supreme Court of Victoria Website

1836 births
1919 deaths
Judges of the Supreme Court of Victoria
Lawyers from London
Academic staff of the University of Melbourne
Colony of Victoria judges
Australian Knights Bachelor
19th-century English lawyers
English emigrants to colonial Australia